SwellPath was an internet marketing consultancy in Portland, Oregon, that focused on web analytics (with an emphasis on Google Analytics custom tagging and reporting) and search engine marketing. SwellPath was a Google Analytics certified partner and was one of the first agencies worldwide to be certified as a specialist for Google Analytics Tag Manager.

SwellPath was acquired by 6D Global Technologies, Inc. in March 2015.

History
SwellPath was founded by John P. Koenig in 2008. After establishing a small group of clients, Koenig partnered with Adam Ware, then working at RYZ, on January 1, 2009.

In September 2009, the company became a part of Google Analytics Certified Partner program. In 2012, Koenig split from SwellPath to spin off an internal project into a full-fledged startup, Measureful. In January 2013, SwellPath operated with a team of 12 people.

Former SwellPath employees have made a few notable contributions to the internet marketing community, including "How to Prepare for AuthorRank and Get the Jump on Google". The peer-reviewed article was published by SEOmoz and has been read over 40,000 times (according to SEOmoz's post analytics) and has been cited by 2,063 other articles. SwellPath team members have also been presenters at conferences such as Danny Sullivan's SMX (Search Marketing Expo), Jive Software's JiveWorld, Web Visions, and various WordCamps.

In March 2015, SwellPath was Acquired by 6D Global Technologies, a digital business solutions company.

In September 2015, 6D Global Technologies (under the ticker symbol SIXD on the NASDAQ) was delisted after the indictment of Benjamin Wey, whose reverse merger schemes led to delisting of the companies he was involved in.   Just prior to this delisting, BDO, SIXD's auditor, resigned after it failed to have Tejune Kang removed as CEO of SIXD as BDO could not reconcile the numerous misrepresentations Tejune Kang had given to them, to the board, the SEC and NASDAQ, including the gifting of unregistered stock to known Wey associates.  SIXD's stock price dropped significantly before this delisting, even when all there was was good news" coming from SIXD about acquisitions, increased profits, listing on the prestigious Russell indexes, etc.. Benjamin Wey and Tejune Kang have been embroiled in law suits regarding this since.

Philanthropic work
Koenig had stated that the core values of non-profit work are reflected in SwellPath's company culture. This was evidenced in a number of philanthropically-oriented projects. Up until June 2010, SwellPath was involved in Web Analytics Demystified's Analysis Exchange program, in which mentors and students work together to help non-profits and NGOs with web analytics. In November 2012, SwellPath partnered with interactive agency, Blue Collar Interactive, to offer $100,000 in agency services to a qualified startup and "energize a passionate business that needs our help".

References

External links 
 Official website 

Marketing companies of the United States
Companies based in Portland, Oregon
Privately held companies based in Oregon
Marketing companies established in 2008
2008 establishments in Oregon
2015 mergers and acquisitions
Business services companies disestablished in 2015
2015 disestablishments in Oregon